A fringe benefits tax (FBT) is  taxation of most, but not all fringe benefits, which are generally non-cash employee benefits.  The rationale behind FBT is that it helps restore equity and fairness to those employees who do not receive such benefits, and allows a Federal Government to more fairly assess taxpayer entitlement to government benefits, or liability to government taxes or levies.

This kind of taxation is done in a number of countries and the applicable laws vary. See the corresponding articles for details.

Fringe benefits tax (Australia)
Fringe benefits tax (New Zealand)
Fringe benefits tax (India)

References

Personal taxes
Employee benefits